Father Gets Untangled (Spanish Papá se desenreda) is a 1940 Mexican comedy film. It stars Sara García. It was followed by a sequel Father Gets Entangled Again.

External links
 

1942 films
1940s Spanish-language films
Mexican black-and-white films
Mexican comedy films
1942 comedy films
1940s Mexican films